The year 1871 in archaeology involved some significant events.

Explorations
 Karl Mauch explores and describes the ruins of Great Zimbabwe.

Excavations
 October 11 - Heinrich Schliemann begins his excavations of Troy.
 Hjalmar Stolpe begins his excavations of Birka.

Publications
 Edward Burnett Tylor's anthropological text Primitive Culture.

Finds
 Gezer discovered by Charles Simon Clermont-Ganneau.
 Hut on Novaya Zemlya used by Willem Barentsz's expedition is found by Norwegian seal hunter Elling Carlsen.

Awards

Miscellaneous

Births
 October 11 - Harriet Boyd Hawes, American archaeologist of the Minoan civilization (died 1945)

Deaths

See also
Ancient Egypt / Egyptology

References

Archaeology
Archaeology by year
Archaeology
Archaeology